Australia has over 130 skyscrapers —buildings which reach or exceed heights of )— complete and or under construction, all spread throughout five cities of the country. Most skyscrapers are located in cities within the Eastern states of Australia, and a number of these cities, such as Melbourne and Sydney, also rank high in the world list of cities with the most skyscrapers.

Cities by number of skyscrapers
Five cities in Australia currently host at least one skyscraper – all of which are state capitals, with the exception of the Gold Coast, a city in the state of Queensland. Of Australian cities which comprise skyscrapers, Sydney constructed the first skyscraper in the country in 1967, followed by Melbourne in 1972, Brisbane and Perth in 1988, and most recently, the Gold Coast in 2005. Most skyscrapers in Australia are concentrated in the Eastern states (Queensland, New South Wales, and Victoria), whilst a smaller number are located in the Western Australia state capital, Perth. The cities with the highest number of skyscrapers have traditionally been either Sydney or Melbourne since the 1970s. The only other capital cities in Australia to not feature any skyscrapers whatsoever are Adelaide in South Australia, Hobart in Tasmania, Darwin in the Northern Territory, and Australia's capital, Canberra in the Australian Capital Territory.

City precincts by number of skyscrapers
This is a list of all the city precincts in Australia with skyscrapers  or greater in height. Included in this table are precincts with no existing skyscrapers, but that have at least one skyscraper under construction or topped-out; these precincts are not ranked.

 Abbreviations

See also 
 List of tallest buildings in Australia
 List of tallest structures in Australia
 List of tallest buildings in Oceania
 List of cities with the most skyscrapers

References

External links 
 Australia's listing on SkyscraperPage.com

 Cities
Skyscrapers